Jiří Vykoukal (29 July 1922 – 2 June 1974) was a Czech rower. He competed in the men's double sculls event at the 1952 Summer Olympics.

References

External links
 

1922 births
1974 deaths
Czech male rowers
Olympic rowers of Czechoslovakia
Rowers at the 1952 Summer Olympics
People from Napajedla
Sportspeople from the Zlín Region